Princess Abha Barni (formerly Princess Abha Barni Gagananga ; ; born 28 March 1874 - 6 August 1938) was a wife of Prince Svasti Sobhana and became Princess Abha Barni Svastivatana. When her daughter became queen, she was elevated to the style Royal Highness by her son-in-law, the King.

Early life 
Princess Abha Barni Gagananga was born on 28 March 1876, to Gagananga Yukala, Prince Bijitprijakara (a son of King Mongkut and consort Phueng) and Mom Sun Gagananga Na Ayutthaya. She had 5 siblings younger sister and younger brother :
 Princess Klang Gagananga
 Princess Chavi Vilaya Gagananga
 Prince Noi Ganganang
 Prince Klang Gagananga  
 Prince Pridiyakara Gagananga

Issue 
She had 9 children with Prince Svasti Sobhana ;

 Prince  Seri Svastikamol Svastivatana (Male) (6 September 1902 — 7 March 1911)
 Prince Sobhon Bharadaya Svastivatana (8 January 1903 — 17 July 1969) Married with Princess Mayurachatra, Mom Tuaengnuan and Mom Prathueng Svativatana Na Ayudhya
 Queen Rambai Barni (20 December 1904 — 22 May 1984) later Queen of Siam when she married King Prajadhipok
 Prince  Mai (Male)    (19 February 1905 — 17 March 1905)
 Prince  Duaeng (male) (25 April 1908 — 30 May 1908)
 Prince  Nanyadivat Svastivatana      (25 April 1909 — 18 October 1958) Married with Mom Chao Suvabhab Berabanna Vudhijaya
 Prince  Orachun Jitsanu Svastivatana (15 January 1910 — 26 October 1969) Married with Princess Chandrakanmani
 Prince  Rodramabhat Svastivatana     (24 February 1915 — 4 August 1917)
 Prince  Yuditya Sathira Svastivatana (9 March 1917 — 24 September 1985) Married with Mom Rajawongse Battaratridhot Devakula

Ancestry

Thai royal decoration 
  Dame Grand Cross (First Class) of The Most Illustrious Order of Chula Chom Klao
  Sovereign Knight Grand Cordon with Chain of the Order of the White Elephant, Special Class
  King Rama VI Royal Cypher Medal (First Class) 
  King Rama VII Royal Cypher Medal (First Class)

References

Thai female Phra Ong Chao
Gagananga family
Thai princesses consort
People from Bangkok
1874 births
1938 deaths
Dames Grand Cross of the Order of Chula Chom Klao
19th-century Thai people
19th-century Thai women
19th-century Chakri dynasty
20th-century Chakri dynasty
Thai female Mom Chao